Events in the year 2011 in Montenegro.

Incumbents
President: Filip Vujanović
Prime Minister: Igor Lukšić

Events

 15 October - the Dajbabska Gora Tower officially opens

Arts and entertainment

Sports
Football (soccer) competitions: Montenegrin First League, Montenegrin Cup.

 The Montenegrin Women's League is founded

Deaths

References

 
Montenegro
Years of the 21st century in Montenegro